Carlos Djaló Só (born 12 February 1993) is a Bissau-Guinean-born Portuguese professional footballer who plays as a forward.

Career
In 2014, Djaló trialed for the youth academy of Spanish La Liga side Valencia after playing for London APSA in the English ninth division.

In 2016, he signed for Albanian second division club Besëlidhja after playing for Tourizense in the Portuguese third division.

In 2019, he signed for Bulgarian lower league team Pirin (Razlog) after playing for Korinthos in the Greek lower leagues.

In 2020, Djaló signed for Slovenian second division outfit Krško.

In 2022, Djaló signed for Asd Vico Equense in Eccellenza Italiana.

References

External links
 
 Carlos Djaló at playmakerstats.com

Living people
1993 births
Portuguese people of Bissau-Guinean descent
Portuguese footballers
Association football forwards
Kategoria e Parë players
Slovenian Second League players
London APSA F.C. players
G.D. Tourizense players
KF Besëlidhja Lezhë players
Tadcaster Albion A.F.C. players
Romford F.C. players
Niki Tragano F.C. players
P.A.S. Korinthos players
FC Pirin Razlog players
NK Krško players
Campeonato de Portugal (league) players
Portuguese expatriate footballers
Portuguese expatriate sportspeople in England
Expatriate footballers in England
Portuguese expatriate sportspeople in Albania
Expatriate footballers in Albania
Portuguese expatriate sportspeople in Greece
Expatriate footballers in Greece
Portuguese expatriate sportspeople in Bulgaria
Expatriate footballers in Bulgaria
Portuguese expatriate sportspeople in Slovenia
Expatriate footballers in Slovenia